The canton of Nice-3 is an administrative division of the Alpes-Maritimes department, southeastern France. Its borders were modified at the French canton reorganisation which came into effect in March 2015. Its seat is in Nice.

It consists of the following communes:
Le Broc
Carros
Gattières
Nice (partly)

References

Cantons of Alpes-Maritimes